Beata Pacut (born 13 December 1995) is a Polish judoka. She is a bronze medalist at the 2022 World Judo Championships and a gold medalist at the 2021 European Judo Championships. She also competed at the World Judo Championships in 2017, 2018, 2019 and 2021.

Career 

She competed in the women's 78 kg and women's team events at the 2017 European Judo Championships held in Warsaw, Poland.

In 2019, she won one of the bronze medals in the women's 78 kg event at the Military World Games held in Wuhan, China. In 2020, she lost her bronze medal match against Karla Prodan of Croatia in the women's 78 kg event at the European Judo Championships held in Prague, Czech Republic.

In 2021, she competed in the women's 78 kg event at the Judo World Masters held in Doha, Qatar. A few months later, she won the gold medal in her event at the 2021 European Judo Championships held in Lisbon, Portugal. In June 2021, she competed in the women's 78 kg event at the World Judo Championships held in Budapest, Hungary.

She represented Poland at the 2020 Summer Olympics in Tokyo, Japan. She competed in the women's 78 kg event where she was eliminated in her second match by Shori Hamada of Japan.

In 2022, she lost her bronze medal match in her event at the Judo Grand Prix Almada held in Almada, Portugal. She won the gold medal in her event at the 2022 Judo Grand Slam Tel Aviv held in Tel Aviv, Israel.

Achievements

References

External links
 
 
 

Living people
1995 births
Place of birth missing (living people)
Polish female judoka
Judoka at the 2019 European Games
European Games competitors for Poland
Judoka at the 2020 Summer Olympics
Olympic judoka of Poland
21st-century Polish women